The Oxford Reading Tree is a series of books published by Oxford University Press, for teaching children to read using phonics. The series contains over 800 books.

The "Biff, Chip and Kipper" stories, written by Roderick Hunt and illustrated by Alex Brychta, were used as the basis for the television programme The Magic Key. The Oxford Reading Tree contains other series of books including "Floppy's Phonics", "Songbirds Phonics" by Julia Donaldson, and "Oxford Reading Tree inFact".

References

External links

Series of children's books